Black Hawk Lake is a natural glacially-formed lake measuring  in area in Sac County, Iowa, at the eastern edge of the city of Lake View, Iowa in Viola and Wall Lake Townships. It exits through the oddly named "Ditch No. 57"  to Indian Creek, a tributary of the North Raccoon River. It is named for Chief Black Hawk.

The state of Iowa maintains a state park and a wildlife management area around the lake. There is a boat ramp and campgrounds and easy access for fishing. The park and lake are the northern end of the Sauk Rail Trail, a trail using an abandoned rail right of way, terminating in the south at Swan Lake. There are plans to establish a hiking and bicycle trail through publicly owned areas surrounding the lake.

Sources

Black Hawk Lake Park (Iowa DNR)
Lake statistics and amenities (Iowa DNR)
Trail development (commercial site)

Lakes of Iowa
Bodies of water of Sac County, Iowa
Glacial lakes of the United States